"The Day" is a song by American electronica musician Moby, from his tenth studio album Destroyed (2011). It was released as the album's second single on May 9, 2011.

Background 
Moby talked about the track on his website blog, saying "'The Day' was written in a hotel room in Spain at dawn when I hadn't slept. It was a beautiful hotel room, a beautiful perfect hotel room and it was six or seven in the morning. I wrote it on an acoustic guitar and recorded it on my phone, brought it home and re-recorded it with old broken down electronics that I have in my studio".

The track is a return to a more electronic sound than his last album Wait for Me. Moby says it was inspired by David Bowie and Brian Eno's production "circa Low and Heroes".

This song and "Bleu Noir" by Mylène Farmer both use a similar backing track (the latter song was also produced by Moby).

Release 
"The Day" was first released in advance on April 2, 2011 on the iTunes Store. The song was officially released as a single bundled with remixes on May 9.

Music video 
On April 21, 2011, Moby released the song's video, directed by Evan Bernard. The video stars Heather Graham as a beautiful angel who slays demons in a hospital. The video is intercut with patients lying in bed, as well as Moby singing the song as other people lie on the ceiling.

Legacy 
The song appears in the 2013 film Trance.

Track listing

 Digital single – remixes
"The Day" – 4:32
"The Day"  – 3:33
"The Day"  – 4:19
"The Day"  – 6:47
"The Day"  – 6:00
"The Day"  – 6:31
"The Day"  – 7:15
"The Day"  – 4:50

 Digital single – remixes 
"The Day"  – 6:47
"The Day"  – 4:19
"The Day"  – 6:00
"Victoria Lucas"  – 9:18
 Digital single – remixes 
"The Day"  – 6:31
"The Day"  – 7:15
"The Day"  – 7:34
 Digital single – remixes 
"The Day"  – 4:48
"The Day"  – 6:29
"Sevastopol"  – 5:12

References

External links 
 

Moby songs
2011 singles
2011 songs
Mute Records singles
Songs written by Moby